Locumba is a town in the Tacna Region in southern Peru. It is the capital of Jorge Basadre Province.

In 1880, it was the site of a battle against Chile during the War of the Pacific.

From 1890 to 1929, the town served as the provisional capital of Tacna Department due to the city of Tacna being under Chilean administration at the time.

References

Populated places in the Tacna Region